Serphitidae is a family of microscopic parasitic wasps known from the Cretaceous period.

Taxonomy 
This family was described in 1937 by the American entomologist Charles Thomas Brues to classify a fossil insect caught in an amber piece from Canada. The species was named Serphites paradoxus. After that, more genera were described and included in this family, like Archaeromma and Distylopus by the Japanese entomologist Hiroshi Yoshimoto in 1975, from fossils also found in Canadian amber, and Aposerphites, Microserphites and new species of Serphites in 1979 by the Russian entomologist Mikhail Vasilievich Kozlov and Alexandr Rasnitsyn, from Siberian amber. Serphitidae is placed with another extinct family, Archaeoserphitidae as members of the superfamily Serphitoidea, Serphitoidea in turn is the sister group of the superfamily Mymarommatoidea, the only living family of which is Mymarommatidae. The clade containing both superfamilies is named Bipetiolarida, which is placed within the Proctotrupomorpha.

 Microserphitinae 
Microserphites 
†Microserphites parvulus  - Cenomanian, Taimyr Amber, Russia
†Microserphites soplaensis  - Early Albian, Spanish amber (El Soplao Amber), Las Penosas Formation, Spain
Microserphites libanensis Rasnitsyn et al. 2022 Barremian, Lebanese amber
Leptoserphites Rasnitsyn et al. 2022 Barremian, Lebanese amber
Leptoserphites pabloi Rasnitsyn et al. 2022 Barremian, Lebanese amber
Leptoserphites irae Rasnitsyn et al. 2022 Barremian, Lebanese amber
 Serphitinae  
Aposerphites 
†Aposerphites angustus  - Upper Albian, Álava amber, Escucha Formation, Spain
†Aposerphites solox  - Cenomanian, Taimyr Amber, Russia
Burserphites 
†Burserphites applanatus  - Cenomanian, Burmese amber, Myanmar
†Burserphites myanmarensis  - Cenomanian, Burmese amber, Myanmar
Jubaserphites 
†Jubaserphites ethani  - Upper Campanian, Canadian amber, Grassy Lake locality, Canada
Mesoserphites 
†Mesoserphites annulus  - Cenomanian, Burmese amber, Myanmar
†Mesoserphites engeli  - Cenomanian, Burmese amber, Myanmar
†Mesoserphites giganteus  - Cenomanian, Burmese amber, Myanmar
†Mesoserphites scutatus  - Cenomanian, Burmese amber, Myanmar
†Mesoserphites viraneacapitis  - Cenomanian, Burmese amber, Myanmar
Serphites 
 †Serphites bruesi  - Campanian, Canadian amber, Canada
 †Serphites dux  - Cenomanian, Taimyr amber, Russia
 †Serphites fannyae  - Turonian, Vendée amber, France
 †Serphites gigas  - Cenomanian, Taimyr amber, Russia 
 †Serphites hynemani  - Campanian, Canadian amber, Canada
 †Serphites kuzminae  - Campanian, Canadian amber, Canada
 †Serphites lamiak  - Upper Albian, Álava amber, Escucha Formation, Spain
 †Serphites naveskinae  - Turonian, New Jersey amber, United States
 †Serphites paradoxus  - Campanian, Canadian amber, Canada
 †Serphites pygmaeus  - Campanian, Canadian amber, Canada
 †Serphites raritanensis  - Turonian, New Jersey Amber, United States
 †Serphites silban  - Upper Albian, San Just amber, Escucha Formation, Spain
Buserphites Herbert & McKellar, 2022 Cenomanian, Burmese amber, Myanmar,
B. applanatus Herbert & McKellar, 2022
B. myanmarensis Herbert & McKellar, 2022
Mesoserphites Herbert & McKellar, 2022 Cenomanian, Burmese amber, Myanmar,
M. annulus Herbert & McKellar, 2022
M. giganteus Herbert & McKellar, 2022
M. engeli Herbert & McKellar, 2022
M. scutatus Herbert & McKellar, 2022
M. viraneacapiti Herbert & McKellar, 2022
 Supraserphitinae  
Supraserphites 
†Supraserphites draculi  - Cenomanian, Burmese amber, Myanmar
†Supraserphites sidorchukae  - Cenomanian, Burmese amber, Myanmar
†Supraserphites margritae Rasnitsyn & Öhm-Kühnle, 2020  - Cenomanian, Burmese amber, Myanmar
†Supraserphites vorontsovi Rasnitsyn & Öhm-Kühnle, 2020  - Cenomanian, Burmese amber, Myanmar

References 

†Serphitidae
Prehistoric hymenoptera
Prehistoric insect families
Taxa named by Charles Thomas Brues
Mesozoic first appearances
Mesozoic extinctions
Canadian amber